Sukhbhadar River is a river in western India in Gujarat whose origin is Vadi hills. Its basin has a maximum length of 194 km. The total catchment area of the basin is 2118 km2.

References

Rivers of Gujarat
Rivers of India